Robert Braunch was an English academic in the late 14th and early 15th centuries.

Braunch (some sources Branch) became Master of Trinity Hall, Cambridge in 1384. He died in 1413.

References

Year of birth missing
1384 deaths
Masters of Trinity Hall, Cambridge